Mike Saunders (born October 3, 1969) is a former Canadian Football League (CFL) running back who played eight seasons for five different teams.

Biography
Saunders was born in Milton, Wisconsin and attended the University of Iowa. He was named CFL All-Star in 1995. He retired on May 8, 2000, as the Saskatchewan Roughriders second all-time leading rusher with 872 carries for 4,396 yards and 39 touchdowns. Over eight CFL seasons, he rushed 1,160 times for 5,780 yards and 39 touchdowns.

References

	

1969 births
Living people
American football running backs
American players of Canadian football
Canadian football running backs
Hamilton Tiger-Cats players
Iowa Hawkeyes football players
Montreal Alouettes players
People from Milton, Wisconsin
Players of American football from Wisconsin
Saskatchewan Roughriders players
San Antonio Texans players
Toronto Argonauts players